An ectopia is a displacement or malposition of an organ or other body part, which is then referred to as ectopic. Most ectopias are congenital, but some may happen later in life.

Examples
Ectopic ACTH syndrome, also known as small-cell carcinoma.
Ectopic calcification, a pathologic deposition of calcium salts in tissues or bone growth in soft tissues
Cerebellar tonsillar ectopia, aka Chiari malformation, a herniation of the brain through the foramen magnum, which may be congenital or caused by trauma. 
Ectopic cilia, a hair growing where it isn't supposed to be, commonly an eyelash on an abnormal spot on the eyelid, distichia
Ectopia cordis, the displacement of the heart outside the body during fetal development 
Ectopic enamel, a tooth abnormality, where enamel is found in an unusual location, such as at the root of a tooth
Ectopic expression, the expression of a gene in an abnormal place in an organism
Ectopic hormone, a hormone produced by a tumor, such as small-cell carcinoma, can cause Cushing's syndrome 
Ectopia lentis, the displacement of the crystalline lens of the eye
Neuronal ectopia
Ectopic pancreas, displacement of pancreatic tissue in the body with no connection, anatomical or vascular, to the pancreas
Ectopic recombination, the recombination between sequences (like leu2 sequences) present at different genomic locations
Renal ectopia occurs when both kidneys are on the same side of the body
Ectopic testis, a testis that has moved to an unusual location
Ectopic thymus,  where thymus tissue is found in an abnormal location
Ectopic thyroid, where an entire or parts of the thyroid are located elsewhere in the body
Ectopic tooth, a tooth that erupted outside the dental arch
Ectopic ureter, where the ureter terminates somewhere other than the urinary bladder
Ectopia vesicae,  a congenital anomaly in which part of the urinary bladder is present outside the body

See also
Ectopic beat of the heart
Cervical ectropion
Ectopic pregnancy, where the fertilized egg implants anywhere other than the uterine wall
Heterotopia (medicine)

Set index articles